Rhaponticum is a genus of flowering plants in the tribe Cardueae within the family Asteraceae.

Description 
Rhaponticum species are perennial herbaceous plants with simple, rarely branched stems. The leaves are simple to pinnatifid. The inflorescence is on the apex of the stem. The fruit is an achene with a hairy pappus.

Systematics

Species 
The genus comprises the following species.
 Rhaponticum acaule (L.) DC. - Morocco, Algeria, Tunisia, Libya
 Rhaponticum aulieatense Iljin - Kazakhstan, Uzbekistan, Tajikistan, Kyrgyzstan
 Rhaponticum australe (Gaudich.) - Austral cornflower, native thistle - Queensland, Victoria
 Rhaponticum berardioides (Batt.) Dobignard  - Morocco
 Rhaponticum canariense DC. - Canary Islands
 Rhaponticum carthamoides (Willd.) Iljin - maral root - Kazakhstan, Mongolia, Xinjiang, Russia (Altai Krai, Chita, Irkutsk)
 Rhaponticum centauroides (L.) O.Bolòs - France, Spain
 Rhaponticum coniferum (L.) Greuter - Spain, Portugal, France, Italy, Algeria, Morocco, Tunisia
 Rhaponticum cossonianum (Ball) Greuter - Morocco
 Rhaponticum exaltatum (Willk.) Greuter - Spain, Portugal, Morocco
 Rhaponticum heleniifolium Godr. & Gren. - Austria, Switzerland, France, Italy
 Rhaponticum hierroi (Eren.) Kangay - Turkey
 Rhaponticum insigne (Boiss.) Wagenitz - Iran, Turkey
 Rhaponticum integrifolium C.Winkl. - Kazakhstan, Uzbekistan, Tajikistan, Kyrgyzstan
 Rhaponticum karatavicum Iljin - Uzbekistan, Tajikistan, Kyrgyzstan
 Rhaponticum longifolium (Hoffmanns. & Link) Dittrich - Morocco
 Rhaponticum lyratum C.Winkl. ex Iljin - Kazakhstan, Uzbekistan, Tajikistan, Kyrgyzstan
 Rhaponticum namanganicum Iljin - Kazakhstan, Uzbekistan, Tajikistan, Kyrgyzstan
 Rhaponticum nanum Lipsky - Kazakhstan, Uzbekistan, Tajikistan, Kyrgyzstan, Afghanistan
 Rhaponticum nitidum Fisch. - Kazakhstan, Uzbekistan, Altai Krai
 Rhaponticum orientale (Serg.)  Peshkova
 Rhaponticum pulchrum Fisch. & C.A.Mey. - Azerbaijan, Republic of Georgia, Iran, Afghanistan
 Rhaponticum repens  (L.) Hidalgo - Russian knapweed, creeping knapweed, hardheads, blueweed - Central Asia; naturalized in Europe, southwest Asia, Australia, North America
 Rhaponticum scariosum Lam. - France, Italy, Switzerland, Slovenia
 Rhaponticum serratuloides (Georgi) Bobrov - Baltic States, Belarus, Ukraine, Romania, European Russia, Moldova, Altai Krai, Turkey, Kazakhstan

Formerly included 
Several species are now relegated to other genera: Centaurea, Klasea, Ochrocephala, Stemmacantha, and  Synurus.

References

Asteraceae genera
Cynareae